Soetendalsvlei is a natural fresh water lake in the Agulhas Plains in the Western Cape province of South Africa. It is the southernmost lake of the African continent and South Africa's second largest freshwater lake after Lake Chrissie. The lake, situated in a landscape called strandveld, home to a particular type of fynbos vegetation, is a prominent area for twitchers. The lake gets its name from the Zoetendaal, a Dutch East India Company ship, that was wrecked on the coast near Cape Agulhas on 23 August 1673. It is the oldest shipwreck of the South African coast. The survivors started walking towards the Cape and reached a large unknown fresh water lake about three hours later. They named the lake out off relief and gratitude after their ship.

References 

Lakes of South Africa
Landforms of the Western Cape
Protected areas of the Western Cape